Kerry Wyborn (born 22 December 1977 in Auburn, New South Wales) is a softball player from Australia, who won a silver medal at the 2004 Summer Olympics and a bronze medal at the 2008 Summer Olympics.

External links
 Australian Olympic Committee profile

1977 births
Australian softball players
Living people
Olympic softball players of Australia
Softball players at the 2008 Summer Olympics
Softball players at the 2004 Summer Olympics
Olympic silver medalists for Australia
Olympic bronze medalists for Australia
Sportswomen from New South Wales
Olympic medalists in softball
Medalists at the 2008 Summer Olympics
Sportspeople from Sydney
Medalists at the 2004 Summer Olympics